Polybranchia is a genus of sacoglossan sea slugs, shell-less marine opisthobranch gastropod mollusks in the family Hermaeidae.

Species 
Species within the genus Polybranchia include:
 Polybranchia borgninii (Trinchese, 1896)
 Polybranchia orientalis (Kelaart, 1858)
 Polybranchia pallens (Burn, 1957)
 Polybranchia papillosa (Pease, 1866)
 Polybranchia pellucida Pease, 1860
 Polybranchia prasinus (Bergh, 1871)
 Polybranchia viridis (Deshayes, 1857)
 Polybranchia westralis Jensen, 1993
 Polybranchia sp. 1 from Kungkungan Bay, North Sulawesi, Indonesia

References

 Gofas, S.; Le Renard, J.; Bouchet, P. (2001). Mollusca, in: Costello, M.J. et al. (Ed.) (2001). European register of marine species: a check-list of the marine species in Europe and a bibliography of guides to their identification. Collection Patrimoines Naturels, 50: pp. 180–213

External links 

Hermaeidae
Taxa named by William Harper Pease